Anophiodes indistinctus is a species of moth of the family Erebidae. It is found in Indonesia on Seram.

References

Moths described in 1922
Anophiodes
Moths of Indonesia